The 2020 North Texas SC season is the second season in the soccer team's history, where they compete in the third division of American soccer, USL League One. North Texas SC, as a child club of FC Dallas of Major League Soccer, are barred from participating in the 2020 U.S. Open Cup. North Texas SC will play their first two home games at Toyota Stadium in Frisco, Texas, United States, and their remaining home games at Globe Life Park in Arlington, Texas.

Club

Roster 
As of July 27, 2020.

Coaching staff 
As of February 27, 2020.

Front Office Staff

Competitions

Exhibitions

USL League One

Standings

Results summary

Results by round

Match results

References

North Texas SC seasons
North Texas SC
North Texas SC
North Texas SC